Giovanni Maria Casini (16 December 1652 – 25 February 1719) was an Italian composer, notably of oratorios in his native Florence.

Selected works and recordings
Pensieri in partitura for organ, Op.3 1714, recorded Francesco Tasini Tactus 2012
Casini oratorio: Il Viaggio Di Tobia Laura Antonaz, Claudine Ansermet, Mya Fracassini, Jeremy Ovenden, Sergio Foresti, I Barocchisti, Diego Fasolis Dynamic, DDD, 2004 2015

References

1652 births
1719 deaths
Italian composers
Italian Baroque composers